In mathematics, the Jacobi group, introduced by 
, is the semidirect product of the symplectic group Sp2n(R) and the Heisenberg group R1+2n.  The concept is named after Carl Gustav Jacob Jacobi. Automorphic forms on the Jacobi group are called Jacobi forms.

References

Modular forms
Lie groups